The Chicago School of Professional Psychology (The Chicago School) is a private university with its main campus in Chicago, Illinois. Established in 1979, The Chicago School of Professional Psychology was primarily focused on the  professional application of psychology. Today it has more than 6,000 students at campuses across the United States and online. The university offers more than 30 academic programs in a variety of professional fields such as psychology, business, health care, health services, education, counseling, and nursing.

History
The Chicago School of Professional Psychology was established in 1979. Initial plans for the school were made in 1977 and realized in January 1979 by the nonprofit Midwestern Psychology Development Foundation. The first classes were held in 1979 at 30 West Chicago Avenue, before moving in 1980 to the Fine Arts Building on Michigan Avenue. In 1986, it moved to Dearborn Station in Chicago's South Loop. In 2004, the school moved to its current location on the Chicago River at  325 N. Wells Street.

The school expanded to the West Coast, adding three campuses in Southern California. The first out-of-state location was opened in downtown Los Angeles in the summer of 2008. The school announced a formal affiliation with the California Graduate Institute and its campuses in Westwood and Irvine in the fall of 2008, although the L.A. location did not receive accreditation until a full decade later in 2018. Having developed from the psychoanalytically oriented clinical training at CGI, the Westwood campus maintained the psychoanalytic training model of its predecessor until it closed in the summer of 2014. CGI has now formally been incorporated into the Applied Clinical Psychology doctoral (PsyD) program.

2012 Los Angeles Campus lawsuit, settlement, and accreditation

In 2012, a group of 40 students who had enrolled in the inaugural 2008 clinical psychology doctoral cohort at the Los Angeles campus sued the school alleging that they were misled and deceived by the school into attending a doctoral program that was not accredited by the American Psychological Association (APA). Students stated that they were offered admission to the Los Angeles campus after applying to the APA accredited Chicago campus doctoral program, while the school knowingly "downplayed" the fact that the Los Angeles campus had no clear path towards accreditation at the time that admission was offered. A group of 26 students subsequently filed a class-action lawsuit in 2014. In September 2016, the court found that students were not properly apprised as to the accreditation differences between the Chicago and the Los Angeles campus programs. The Chicago School settled the lawsuit for $11.2 million dollars. The Los Angeles campus Clinical Psychology PsyD program obtained APA accreditation in 2018, two years after the fraud payout.

Academics
All branches of the Chicago School are accredited by the WASC Senior College and University Commission (WSCUC). The School Psychology doctoral (EdS) program in Chicago, Illinois, is accredited by the Illinois State Board of Education. 

The Clinical Psychology doctoral (PsyD) program in Chicago, Illinois, is accredited by the American Psychological Association until 2023. The Clinical Psychology doctoral (PsyD) program in Washington, D.C., is accredited by the American Psychological Association until 2024. The Clinical Psychology doctoral (PsyD) program in Los Angeles, California, is accredited by the American Psychological Association until 2028.

The Chicago School of Professional Psychology at Xavier University of Louisiana has been granted initial Accreditation on Contingency status through 2024 by the American Psychological Association (APA).

The school is also an affiliate of the nonprofit TCS Education System.

Campuses

Each campus is equipped with event spaces, at least one classroom, and a library. Locations can be found in the following cities:

 Chicago::  The original location of the Chicago School of Professional Psychology, since 2004, has been housed at 325 North Wells St, in Chicago's River North neighborhood. The building itself opened in 1914 as a Chase and Sanborn Coffee warehouse, a former industrial era building. In 2007 the school expanded across the street to additional space in the Merchandise Mart building.
 Washington, D.C.: This location opened in the summer of 2010, occupying a suite in the McPherson Building at 901 15th St NW.
 Dallas: Located at 2101 Waterview Pkwy in Richardson, Texas.
 New Orleans: While it has no dedicated space of its own, this location uses space at Xavier University of Louisiana, a historically black college.
 Los Angeles: Located at 707 Wilshire Blvd., the L.A. Campus occupies space in the Aon Building.
 Anaheim: Located in Suite 1200 at 2400 E. Katella Ave in Anaheim.
 San Diego: Located at 401 W. A Street, in the building 1 Columbia Place.

Notable alumni
  Anjhula Mya Bais - Psychologist, Trauma Specialist, Human Rights Activist and Model
  David Castain - Entrepreneur and Philanthropist
  Steven Kaufman -  American entrepreneur and Philanthropist  
  Alicia Kozakiewicz - Television personality, Motivational Speaker, and Internet Safety and missing persons advocate
  James P. Liautaud - American industrialist, inventor and business theorist.
  Mohamed Kamarainba Mansaray - a Sierra Leonean politician, psychologist, and the current leader and chairman of the Alliance Democratic Party
  Maurice West - member of the Illinois House of Representatives for the 67th district

References

External links
 Official website

1979 establishments in Illinois
Educational institutions established in 1979
Psychology institutes
Graduate schools in the United States
Universities and colleges in Chicago
Psychology organizations based in the United States
Private universities and colleges in Illinois